Gaziosmanpaşa (old name: Taşlıtarla) is a developing working class municipality (belediye) and district of Istanbul, Turkey, on its European side. With a population of 400,000 plus, it is one of the most populous districts. In 2009 Gaziosmanpaşa district was divided into three neighborhoods: Gaziosmanpaşa, the central; Sultangazi, the northern part; and Arnavutköy, the northernmost part. Esenler and Bayrampaşa are at west, Sultangazi is at north and Eyüp is at south and east of district. It was formed from parts of Eyüp and Çatalca districts in 1963.

History
The district was named after Gazi Osman Pasha (1832–1900), a prominent Ottoman general who was active in the Balkans. The area was empty, rocky pasture until the 1950s when immigrants from the Balkans (especially from Bulgaria, Yugoslavia and Western Thrace) settled here. Much of their housing was illegally built, primitive tiny cottages. Gaziosmanpaşa expanded rapidly during the 1970s and 1980s due to migration from eastern Anatolia. The population is still growing with half the people under 20 years old. NBA's Orlando Magic star, Hedo Türkoğlu, who played in the 2009 NBA Finals, was born in the district. The NBA's Cleveland Cavaliers center Semih Erden was also born in the district.

Gaziosmanpaşa today
The centre of Gaziosmanpaşa is still inhabited by the descendants of the 1950s and 1960s Balkan immigrants. Now most of the original illegal houses are being pulled down and replaced with semi-legal blocks of flats to house the children and grandchildren.

Other areas, often isolated communities far out of the city, are dominated by populations of migrants from Anatolia. These areas are an ethnic, religious and political melting pot. In particular, one area of Gaziosmanpaşa has a substantial population of migrants from Tunceli Province, a province mainly populated by people who claim both Kurdish and Zaza identities. The mixture of people plus the number of young people in the communities has at times given Gaziosmanpaşa the unfortunate reputation for being the centre of crime and of left- and right-wing violence in Istanbul.

The city council is trying to spend its way out of this situation by putting in sports facilities, theatres, shopping centres and better transport to the city. But still more and more housing is being built. As the area has grown without sufficient control or regulations the city is still struggling to put in schools and other infrastructure throughout Gaziosmanpaşa to support the population, while industrial development is taking place too.

The area itself suffers from unemployment despite the industry coming in, and the main employers are small workshops producing light fittings, electrical goods, clothing, lathe and metalwork and car repairs.

Urban renewal projects aim to revitalize the district through increasing housing prices.

International relations

Twin towns – Sister cities

 Tutin, Serbia

References

Sources

External links
 District governor's official website 
 District municipality's official website 

 
Populated places in Istanbul Province
Districts of Istanbul Province